G.B. Road, Garstin Bastion Road, (officially changed to Swami Shradhanand Marg in 1966) is a road running from Ajmeri Gate to Lahori Gate in Delhi, India. It is a large red-light district. It has several hundred multi-storey brothels and there are estimated to be over 1,000 sex workers. It is lined with two or three-storey buildings that have shops on ground floor. About twenty of these buildings have about 100 brothels on the first floor that open at night after the shops at ground level close. It is the biggest red light area in Delhi.

History 

The old city of Delhi, Shahjahanabad, was surrounded by a wall. The wall had many gates and bastions. A bastion is an angular structure projecting outward from the curtain wall of an artillery fortification. It is called "Burj" in Arabic and Urdu. One such burj or bastion was named after a British officer of East India Company. The history of G.B. Road can be dated back to Mughal era. It is said that there were five red light areas or kothas (brothels) in Delhi at that time. Then came the British Raj, when a British commissioner Garstin Bastion consolidated all the five kothas in one area on this road. The road has about 100 brothels now. G.B Road has one of the few red light areas in India apart from Kamathipura (Mumbai), Sonagachi (Kolkata) and Chaturbhuj Sthan (Muzaffarpur). The place also contains thousands of prostitution rooms or kothas

Market
The road is famous as a market for machinery, automobile parts, hardware and tools and is the largest market for these items in the National Capital Region. The road is crowded with vehicles and persons during the day as it is a commercial area.

The segment of the road starting from the Ajmeri Gate in the south until the small intersection with a street leading up to Farash Khana in the north has shops on the ground floor and kothas or brothels on the first and second floors.

The streets and houses at the back of the road are residential areas.

Crime
At night, the road is a dangerous place for the uninitiated. Mugging, snatching of wallets, watches and phones and other crimes happen quite often. A policeman on duty was stabbed to death by muggers just after midnight in September 2012 when a posse of policemen tried to save a man from a gang of criminals who had waylaid him on the road and stabbed him while he was going home from work.

See also
 
 Prostitution in India
 Prostitution in Asia 
 Prostitution in Kolkata 
 Prostitution in Mumbai 
 All Bengal Women's Union
 Durbar Mahila Samanwaya Committee 
 Male prostitution

Bibliography

References

External links
 The inner life of GB Road, Yahoo India, 23 July 2008
 Nobody Can Love You More: Life in Delhi's Red Light District - Mayank Austen Soofi
Safety before visit GB road 

 

Prostitution in India 
Neighbourhoods in Delhi
Red-light districts in India